General Mohammed Rafi (Pashtu: محمد رفیع; born 1946) was a member of the Politburo and Deputy Prime Minister (former Defense Minister). He served as Minister of Defense of the Democratic Republic of Afghanistan from 1979 to 1984 and 1986 to 1988.

Mohammed Rafie was one of the vice presidents of Mohammed Najibullah since the 1988 elections.

References

1946 births
Vice presidents of Afghanistan
People's Democratic Party of Afghanistan politicians
Living people
Defence ministers of Afghanistan
Afghan military officers